The Confédération Africaine des Travailleurs Croyants (CATC) is a trade union centre in Republic of the Congo.

The CATC is affiliated with the International Trade Union Confederation.

References

Trade unions in the Republic of the Congo
International Trade Union Confederation